Chullumpirini (chullumpi local name for the white-tufted grebe) is a mountain in the Carabaya mountain range in the Andes of Peru, about  high. It is located in the Puno Region, Carabaya Province, on the border of the districts Coasa and Ituata. Chullumpirini lies east of the lake Laurancocha and north-west of the mountain Muru Muruni.

References

Mountains of Peru
Mountains of Puno Region